In this article, the surname is Nguyễn but is often simplified to Nguyen in English-language text.

Kimberly Nguyen (born September 28, 1997) is a Vietnamese-American poet and essayist. She is a recipient of an Emerging Voices Fellowship from PEN America, a Best of the Net nomination, and a Beatrice Daw Brown Prize for Poetry.

Early life 
Nguyen was born in Omaha, Nebraska to Vietnamese refugees. Her mother was born in Ho Chi Minh City, Vietnam, and her father was born in a farming village in Sốc Trăng, Vietnam. Her parents met at a refugee detention center in Cambodia and eventually relocated to Omaha, Nebraska where they married. Nguyen is the eldest of 3 children.

Nguyen says that she was "born a writer", selecting a pen on her first birthday during a Chinese-Vietnamese tradition called thôi nôi. She struggled with her identity as a writer early in life, but eventually gave in to her "urge to write". She had a difficult relationship with her parents growing up, which influences her work heavily.

Education 
Nguyen attended high school at Roncalli Catholic High School, where she graduated valedictorian in 2015. She was a exceptionally bright student, receiving many awards including an honorable mention and nomination for the 2015 Nebraska All-State Academic Team and the Omaha World Herald Key Staffer Award. After graduating high school, she attended Vassar College and graduated in 2019 with a B.A. in English Literature and Russian Studies. While at Vassar, she studied writing with author and critic Michael Joyce and novelist Amitava Kumar and received a Beatrice Daw Brown Prize for Excellence in Poetry.

Career 
Nguyen's early writing career started in journalism, showing a particular knack for investigative journalism. While at Vassar, she wrote for Vassar's weekly student newspaper, The Miscellany News. Her articles include personal essays on being bilingual, grief, and a coincidental connection to Kimarlee Nguyen, a Cambodian-American writer who also attended Vassar before her. Nguyen's most notable article exposed a legal loophole in the state of New York that allowed Vassar and other colleges to pay students below state minimum wage, and backlash from the article ultimately pressured the school to raise the wage.

Nguyen's poems can be found in various journals including perhappened mag, Hobart, and Muzzle Magazine. She has self-published 3 poetry collections: i am made of war (out of print), flesh, and ghosts in the stalks. ghosts in the stalks was a #3 bestseller in Asian-American poetry on Amazon in 2020. Her latest collection, Here I Am Burn Me, comes out October

Nguyen was an Emerging Voices Fellow at PEN America in 2021 and is currently a Poetry Coalition Fellow at Urban Word NYC through the Academy of American Poets.

Fellowships and Awards 

Currently, Nguyen lives and works in New York City, NY.

References 

Vietnamese women poets
Vassar College alumni
American poets of Asian descent
21st-century American poets
American writers of Vietnamese descent
American women poets
American women writers of Asian descent
1997 births
Living people
Writers of Vietnamese descent